The Hewlett-Packard Voyager series of calculators were introduced by Hewlett-Packard in 1981. All members of this series are programmable, use Reverse Polish Notation, and feature continuous memory. Nearly identical in appearance, each model provided different capabilities and was aimed at different user markets.

Models

The HP calculators Voyager series consisted of five models, some of which were manufactured in several variants (with years of production):
HP-10C – basic scientific calculator (1982–1984).
HP-11C – mid-range scientific calculator (1981–1989).
HP-12C – business/financial calculator (1981–present).
HP-15C – advanced scientific calculator (1982–1989, 2011).
HP-16C – computer programmer's calculator (1982–1989).

HP-10C

The HP-10C is the last and lowest-featured calculator in this line, even though its number would suggest an earlier origin. The 10C was a basic scientific programmable calculator. While a useful general purpose RPN calculator, the HP-11C offered twice as much for only a slight increase in price. Designed to be an introductory calculator, it was still costly compared to the competition, and many looking at an HP would just step up to the better HP-11C. Poor sales led to a very short market life, making it one of the most difficult of the series to find today.

HP-11C

The HP-11C is a mid-range scientific programmable calculator.

HP-12C 

The HP-12C is a popular financial calculator. It was such a successful model that Hewlett-Packard redesigned it from scratch, added several new functions, and introduced it as the HP 12c Platinum in 2003 as well as the HP 12c Prestige. Over the course of years, several anniversary editions of the calculator were produced as well.

The HP-12C is HP's longest and best-selling product, in continual production since its introduction in 1981.

HP-15C

The HP-15C is a high-end scientific programmable with a root-solver and numerical integration, produced between 1982 and 1989. It is also able to handle complex numbers and matrix operations. Although long being discontinued its continued popularity among users triggered Hewlett-Packard to offer a HP 15c Limited Edition remake of the calculator in 2011.

HP-16C

The HP-16C is a computer programmer's calculator, designed to assist in debugging. It can display numbers in hexadecimal, decimal, octal and binary, and convert numbers from one base to another. A number of specialized functions are provided to assist the programmer, including left- and right-shifting, masking, and bitwise logical operations. HP has (as of 2015) never made another programmer's calculator, but has incorporated the 16C's functions in later calculator models.

Features

Arithmetic 
Hewlett-Packard retained the numerical analyst William Kahan of UC Berkeley, the architect of the IEEE 754 standard for floating-point arithmetic, to design the numerical algorithms implemented by the calculators. He also wrote parts of the manuals.

Programming 
The HP Voyager series calculator are keystroke programmable, meaning that it can remember and later execute sequences of keystrokes to solve particular problems of interest to the user. These keystroke programs, in addition to performing any operation normally available on the keyboard, can also make use of conditional and unconditional branching and looping instructions, allowing programs to perform repetitive operations and make decisions.

The available programming features differentiate between the various HP Voyager series calculator systems.

Legacy

The HP-12C and its derivatives remains in widespread use today and is still available from Hewlett-Packard. The long-discontinued HP-15C was re-released in a "Limited Edition" in 2011 that has again been discontinued.

Emulators
Official emulators for the 12C and 15C are commercially available from Hewlett-Packard for Android and iOS devices.

Clones

In 2011, the continued popularity of the Voyager series among users prompted SwissMicros to produce a series of credit-card-sized calculators looking like miniature versions of their HP equivalents and running the original HP firmware in an emulator on a modern calculator hardware. The series consisted of the DM10, DM11, DM12, DM15 and DM16. All calculators used the same hardware, but differ in keyboard and firmware (which can be changed with an upgrade port). After the introduction of the larger DM15L, DM41L and DM16L in 2015, the DM11L was added in January 2016 with the DM12L following in February. A limited production run for a DM10L was planned for 2019.

See also 
 bulk CMOS semiconductor manufacturing process utilized for HP Nut processors

References

Further reading

External links 
 
 
 MyCalcDB:  
 
 SwissMicros Manufacturer of HP calculator clones.

Voyager series